The following is a list of pornographic film studios.

A 
 Abbywinters.com (AUS)
 Active Duty (includes gay content)
 Adam & Eve (USA)
 Anabolic Video (USA)
 Athletic Model Guild (includes gay content)

B 
 Bang Bros
 Beate Uhse AG (DEU)
 BelAmi (includes gay content)
 Black Spark Productions (includes gay content)
 Brasileirinhas (BRA)
 Brazzers (CAN)

C 
 Caballero Home Video (USA)
 Cazzo Film (includes gay content)
 CineMagic (JPN)
 ClubJenna (USA)
 Coat Corporation (includes gay content)
 Cobra Video (includes gay content)
 CockyBoys (includes gay content)
 Color Climax Corporation (DNK)
 Colt Studio Group (includes gay content)
 Corbin Fisher (includes gay content)
 Cross (JPN)

D 
 Devil's Film (includes gay content)
 Diabolic Video (USA)
 Digital Playground (USA)
 Diva Futura (ITA)
 Dogma (JPN)

E 
 Elegant Angel (USA)
 Eurocreme (includes gay content)
 Evil Angel (USA, includes gay content)
 Extreme Associates (USA)

F 
 Falcon Studios (includes gay content)
 Flava Works (includes gay content)
 French Twinks (includes gay content)

G 
 Grooby Productions (Trans content)

H 
 h.m.p. (JPN)
 Hokuto Corporation (JPN)
 Homegrown Video (USA)
 HotMale (includes gay content)
 Hustler Video (USA)

I 
 Innocent Pictures (DNK)

J 
 Jean Daniel Cadinot (includes gay content)
 Jill Kelly Productions (USA)
 JM Productions (USA)
 John Thompson Productions (DEU)
 Jules Jordan Video (USA)

K 
 Kink.com (USA, includes gay content)
 Kuki Inc. (JPN)

L 
 Larry Flynt Publications (USA)
 Lucas Entertainment (includes gay content)

M 
 Mantra Films (USA)
 Marc Dorcel (FRA)
 Moodyz (JPN)
 Mofos
 Model Media (CHN)

N 
 Naughty America (USA)
 New Sensations (USA)
 Ninn Worx (USA)
 Nova Studios (includes gay content)

P 
 Pink and white productions (includes gay content)
 Pink Visual (USA)
 Playboy (USA)
 Private Media Group (ESP)
 Puzzy Power (DNK)

R 
 Raging Stallion Studios (includes gay content)
 Reality Kings (USA)
 Red Hot (GBR)
 Red Light District Video (USA)

S 
 S1 No. 1 Style (JPN)
 The Score Group (USA)
 Sean Cody (includes gay content)
 Shane's World Studios (includes gay content)
 Sin City (USA)
 Smash Pictures (USA)
 Soft on Demand (JPN)
 Sssh.com (USA) (Porn for Women)

T 
 Ten Broadcasting (CAN)
 Third Degree Films (USA)
 Third World Media (USA)
 Titan Media (includes gay content)
 Treasure Island Media (includes gay content)
 Triga Films (includes gay content)

V 
 VCA Pictures (USA)
 Vivid Entertainment (USA)
 Vixen (USA)
 Vouyer Media (USA)

W 
 Wanz Factory (JPN)
 Wicked Pictures (USA)
 William Higgins (includes gay content)

Z 
 Zero Tolerance Entertainment (USA)

See also 

 List of film studios
 List of pornographic performers by decade
 List of pornographic magazines
 List of pornographic film directors
 List of pornography companies

External links 
 List of studios on Internet Adult Film Database
 List of studios on Adult Film Database

Film Studios
 
Pornographic movie studios
Pornographic movie studios